Vermont Voltage was an American soccer team based in St. Albans, Vermont, United States. Founded in 1997, the team played in the USL Premier Development League (PDL), the fourth tier of the American Soccer Pyramid, in the Northeast Division of the Eastern Conference, having spent the 2009 season on hiatus. The Voltage folded after the 2014 season.

The team played its home games at the Collins-Perley Sports Complex. The team's colors were yellow, blue and black.

History
Founded as the Vermont Wanderers in 1997, the team played in the USL Second Division from 1997 to 1998 before moving to the Premier Development League, where it would compete from 1999 to 2014, with a one-year hiatus in 2009. The club played its first game on April 12, 1997, a 0–3 defeat to the New Hampshire Phantoms. The team would reach the playoffs three times in its history, advancing to the conference finals in 2003.

The club also had a sister organization, Vermont Lady Voltage, who played in the USL W-League. Due to stadium renovations, the Lady Voltage folded in 2009.

The Voltage folded in 2014. In 2022 a new USL League Two side, Vermont Green FC was founded.

Year-by-year

Honors
 USL PDL Northeast Division Champions 2002
 USL PDL Northeast Division Champions 2003

Notable former players

This list of notable former players comprises players who went on to play professional soccer after playing for the team in the Premier Development League, or those who previously played professionally before joining the team.

  Stefan Antonijevic
  Roldege Arius
  Terry Boss
  Tomislav Čolić
  Paul Daccobert
  Vladimir Edouard
  Bart Farley
  Mitch Garcia
  Jonathan Glenn
  Matheau Hall
  Goran Hunjak
  Russell Hutchison
  Leo Incollingo
  Adam Kay
  Darko Kolić
  Leonard Krupnik
  Yohance Marshall
  Gavin MacLeod
  Olivier Occéan
  Arsène Oka
  Andrew Olivieri
  Sullivan Silva
  Kyt Selaidopoulos
  Max Touloute
  Kevin Wylie

Head coaches

  Bo Vučković (2000–2014)
  Bo Simić (2007–2008 and 2010)

Stadiums
 Collins-Perley Sports Complex, St. Albans, Vermont (2003–present)
 Stadium at Essex High School, Essex Junction, Vermont 2 games (2005)
 Stadium at Lyndon State College, Lyndon, Vermont 1 game (2011)

Average attendance
Attendance stats are calculated by averaging each team's self-reported home attendances from the historical match archive at 

 2005: 828 (6th highest in PDL)
 2006: 495
 2007: 631
 2008: 692
 2009: Did not play
 2010: 596

References

External links
Official Site

Soccer clubs in Vermont
St. Albans, Vermont
USL Second Division teams
1997 establishments in Vermont
Defunct Premier Development League teams
Defunct soccer clubs in Vermont
Association football clubs established in 1997
2014 disestablishments in Vermont
Association football clubs disestablished in 2014